Alonte is a town in Veneto, Italy.

It may also refer to:
Marlyn Alonte (born 1974), Filipino politician
Ronnie Alonte (born 1996), Filipino actor, model, singer and dancer
Alonte Sports Arena, an indoor arena in Biñan, the Philippines 
San Biagio, Alonte, a Roman Catholic church in Veneto, Italy